Georgi Chelidze (born 24 October 198) is a Georgian professional football manager and a former player.

He signed with Neftchi after several seasons with FC Lokomotiv Moscow, primarily on loan to other clubs.
 
In 2010 he joined Liga Leumit team Sektzia Ness Ziona in Israel.

Chelidze has made one appearance for the Georgia national football team.

Since 2016 he has been a football manager. After several years spent at Shevardeni-1906, Meshakhte Tkibuli, Shukura Kobuleti and Saburtalo-2, in January 2022 he was appointed as head coach of Georgian top-tier club Telavi, where he worked for six months. 

In early November 2022, he took charge of Sioni Bolnisi.

References

External links
 
 

1986 births
Living people
Footballers from Georgia (country)
FC Dinamo Batumi players
FC Lokomotiv Moscow players
FC Zorya Luhansk players
FC Zestafoni players
Neftçi PFK players
FC Metalurgi Rustavi players
Samsunspor footballers
Sektzia Ness Ziona F.C. players
FC Sioni Bolnisi players
Erovnuli Liga players
Russian Premier League players
Süper Lig players
Ukrainian Premier League players
Azerbaijan Premier League players
Liga Leumit players
Georgia (country) international footballers
Expatriate footballers from Georgia (country)
Expatriate footballers in Russia
Expatriate footballers in Ukraine
Expatriate footballers in Azerbaijan
Expatriate footballers in Israel
Expatriate footballers in Turkey
Expatriate sportspeople from Georgia (country) in Russia
Expatriate sportspeople from Georgia (country) in Ukraine
Expatriate sportspeople from Georgia (country) in Azerbaijan
Expatriate sportspeople from Georgia (country) in Israel
Expatriate sportspeople from Georgia (country) in Turkey
Association football forwards